The Franklin Senate District is one of 16 districts of the Vermont Senate. The current district plan is included in the redistricting and reapportionment plan developed by the Vermont General Assembly following the 2020 U.S. Census, which applies to legislatures elected in 2022, 2024, 2026, 2028, and 2030. 

The Franklin district includes all of Franklin County, along with some parts of others.

As of the 2010 census, the state as a whole had a population of 625,741. As there are a total of 30 senators, there were 20,858 residents per senator. 

As of the 2000 census, the state as a whole had a population of 608,827. As there are a total of 30 Senators, there were 20,294 residents per senator.  The Franklin District had a population of 44,056 in that same census.  The district is apportioned two senators. This equals 22,028 residents per senator, 8.54% above the state average.

District Senators 
As of 2018:
Corey Parent, Republican
Randy Brock, Republican

As of 2017

 Carolyn Whitney, Republican Party
 Dustin Degree, Republican Party

Towns and cities in the Franklin District, 2002–2012 elections

Franklin County 

 Bakersfield
 Berkshire
 Enosburg
 Fairfax
 Fairfield
 Fletcher
 Franklin
 Georgia
 Highgate
 Sheldon
 St. Albans
 St. Albans Town
 Swanton

Grand Isle County 

 Alburgh

References

External links 

 Redistricting information from Vermont Legislature
 2002 and 2012 Redistricting information from Vermont Legislature
 Map of Vermont Senate districts and statistics (PDF) 2002–2012

Vermont Senate districts